Mairehau High School is a state co-educational secondary school in Christchurch, New Zealand. The school takes its name from the suburb Mairehau having been adopted in 1916 as a compliment to Mrs Mairehau Hutton whose father, Arthur Gravenor Rhodes, owned considerable property in the area and was a notable benefactor to the district.

The school is located at the northeast end of the suburb, near to Shirley, thus forming a coeducation alternative to Shirley Boys' High School, and Avonside Girls' High School. Mairehau High School opened on 1 February 1961, having been constructed on the advice of the Department of Statistics.

Waka groups
Mairehau uses waka groups in place of school houses. 

The names and colours of the Mairehau waka groups are:
 Waka Ama – Green
 Waka Katea – Blue
 Tau Ihu – Yellow
 Tau Rapa – Red

References

External links

 http://www.mairehau.school.nz/ – Official School Site
School history

Educational institutions established in 1961
Secondary schools in Christchurch
New Zealand secondary schools of Nelson plan construction
1961 establishments in New Zealand